Somewhere in Time is the sixth studio album by English heavy metal band Iron Maiden. It was released on 29 September 1986 in the United Kingdom by EMI Records and in the United States by Capitol Records. It was the band's first album to feature guitar synthesisers.

Since its release, Somewhere in Time has been certified platinum by the RIAA, having sold over one million copies in the US. Somewhere on Tour was the album's supporting tour.

Background
Somewhere in Time is the band's first studio effort following the extensive World Slavery Tour of 1984–85, which was physically draining for the group, lasting 331 days and comprising 187 concerts. The resulting exhaustion is credited as the main factor in the complete lack of songwriting contributions from lead vocalist Bruce Dickinson, whose material was rejected by the rest of the band. Dickinson had written several "acoustic-based" songs, explaining that "I felt we had to come up with our Physical Graffiti or Led Zeppelin IV ... we had to get it onto another level or we'd stagnate and drift away", although bassist and primary writer Steve Harris "thought he'd lost the plot completely", surmising that "he was probably more burnt out than anyone at the end of that last tour". On the other hand, the record is also notable for the number of "fully formed" songs written by guitarist Adrian Smith, who wrote both of the album's singles: "Wasted Years" and "Stranger in a Strange Land", the former of which is the only song on the record not to feature synthesisers.

Following the World Slavery Tour, the group were given four months to recuperate, with Harris, Smith and guitarist Dave Murray spending the time experimenting with new equipment. The result was a marked change in sound for Iron Maiden, as it was their first to use guitar synthesisers, although on their next release, 1988's Seventh Son of a Seventh Son, the effects were provided by keyboards instead. Given their time off, this was their first studio album not to be released a year after their previous one, the band insisting that they have more time "to get it right without hurrying for a change", comments Harris. It was also one of their most expensive records, with the bass and drums recorded in the Bahamas, the guitars and vocals recorded in The Netherlands and the mixing taking place in New York.

Although "space and time" are common themes throughout the release, with songs such as "Wasted Years", "Caught Somewhere in Time", "Stranger in a Strange Land" and "Deja-Vu", the band never intended for it to be a concept album, with Harris stating, "We certainly never went in there and said, 'Right let's write a load of songs on the subject of time.
While the majority of the release's songs have disappeared from the band's live shows shortly after its supporting tour, "Wasted Years" and "Heaven Can Wait" have appeared on several subsequent tours.

The 2008 tribute CD Maiden Heaven: A Tribute to Iron Maiden, released by Kerrang! magazine, features covers of two of the album's songs; "Wasted Years" by DevilDriver and "Caught Somewhere in Time" by Madina Lake.

Cover artwork
The cover for Somewhere in Time, created by the band's then-regular artist Derek Riggs, displays a muscular cyborg-enhanced Eddie in a futuristic, Blade Runner-inspired environment. Much like the cover of Powerslave, the wraparound album cover holds a plethora of references to earlier Iron Maiden albums and songs, such as:

The street sign on the corner where Eddie is standing reads Acacia (partially obscured), a reference to the song "22 Acacia Avenue" from The Number of the Beast (1982).
Below "Acacia" is a poster of Eddie from the first album, with graffiti reading "Eddie lives" written on it. Torn posters are also featured on the "Sanctuary" and "Women in Uniform" singles.
A banner with the words "This is a very boring painting" is displayed backward within the lobby of the Bradbury Towers Hotels International. This can be seen to the left of Eddie's right leg.
In the very centre, just above the "Department" sign and behind the cable going to the cyborg's weapon, there is a small vertical phrase in red neon, which reads "Меня Рвёт" [Menya Rvyot], Russian for "I'm vomiting" — or more literally, "it's tearing me up", depending on the context.
An Eye of Horus neon sign is at the top of a building, a reference to the song "Powerslave" from the 1984 album of the same name.
To the right of Eddie's left leg there is a rubbish bin attached to a lamppost, identical to the one seen on the cover of the Iron Maiden album.
The haloed black cat from the back cover of Live After Death (1985) is on the pavement behind Eddie.
Below the Eye of Horus is the name, "Websters", a tribute to Charlie Webster, EMI's art director.
Derek Riggs' artistic signature symbol can be found on Eddie's chest.

References on the back include:
A clock reading 23:58 ("2 Minutes to Midnight").
Below the clock there is a sign which reads "Phantom Opera House", in reference to the song "Phantom of the Opera" from the first album.
The words "Bollocks again & again" appear just below the "Phantom Opera House".
A building on the left side carries the sign, "Aces High Bar", a reference to the song of the same name.
Flying over the "Aces High Bar" is a Spitfire from the "Aces High" cover.
To the left of the "Aces High Bar" are four letters in yellow and green. These are Hebrew letters spelling out the name of God, namely יהוה, Jehovah/Yahweh.
Below the "Aces High Bar", is a sign that reads "Sand Dune" in reference to their song "To Tame a Land," from Piece of Mind (1983), based on the novel Dune.
Many pyramids appear in the background, a reference to the Powerslave album.
Among the pyramids is a grim reaper similar to that which appears on the covers of "The Trooper" and Live After Death.
The marquee for the cinema reads Blade Runner, the film which inspired the album's cover. It also reads "Live After Death", the name of their 1985 live album.
The cinema is named "Philip K. Dick Cinema", named after the author of Do Androids Dream of Electric Sheep?, the book on which the film Blade Runner was based.
More Blade Runner references include "Dekkers Department Stores" and a "Tyrell Corp" sign.
In the background, "Bradbury Towers" can be seen, a reference to the Bradbury Building which is prominent in Blade Runner.
To the right of the clock is a neon sign which reads "Ancient Mariner Seafood Restaurant", a reference to the song "Rime of the Ancient Mariner" from the Powerslave album.
On the bottom left hand side of the cover is "The Ruskin Arms", famous for being one of the first venues in which Iron Maiden performed.
On the second floor of the "Ruskin Arms" building is a woman sitting in a red lit room which, a reference to Charlotte the Harlot, a repeated character in the band's songs.
Just above "The Ruskin Arms" is a neon sign that reads "Rainbow", another famous venue where Iron Maiden recorded a video in 1980.
Above and to the left of the "Rainbow" sign is a neon sign reading "L'Amours Beer Gardens", a reference to the "L'Amours" rock venue which Iron Maiden once played in Brooklyn, New York.
On the roof of the same building is the TARDIS from the BBC TV series Doctor Who. The TARDIS is also featured on the cover of the "Wasted Years" single.
Above the Bradbury Towers neon sign is Icarus in flames falling from the sky, in the same style of the cover for the band's 1983 single "Flight of Icarus". According to Riggs, Icarus is supposed to look like the logo used by Swan Song Records, a label founded by Led Zeppelin.
On the walkway above the clock is an electronic sign that says "LATEST RESULTS.......WEST HAM 7........ARSENAL 3", a nod to Steve Harris who is a West Ham United supporter.
At the right edge below, just near the band, there is another sign in Russian – Кефир ("KEFIR").
Just above the "KEFIR" sign is a street sign reading "Upton Park," which was the name of West Ham's former stadium.
There is a sign which reads "Tonight: Gypsy's Kiss", a reference to Harris' first band.
On the right side, above the "Bradbury Towers" sign, is a sign in Japanese, "浅田　彰," which refers to a notable Japanese philosopher, economist and critic, Akira Asada.
To the right of the pyramids is a sign reading "Long Beach Arena," which is where most of the Live After Death live album was recorded.
The Syncom sign refers to the 1961 NASA program of the same name.
The neon sign above the band reads "Maggies Revenge" and refers to British Prime Minister Margaret Thatcher, who appears on the cover of the "Sanctuary" and "Women in Uniform" singles.
One of the buildings is labelled "Asimov Foundation", a reference to the Foundation series by Isaac Asimov.
A character wearing a large cloak stands above the walkway's right side, which Riggs claims is Batman.
Above and slightly to the right of the cloaked character reads more Hebrew lettering, "ג'ין" (Gin, in English).
On the right side of the walkway and just above the "Latest Results" sign is the bracket that holds Eddie's skull together from the Piece of Mind album onwards, which Riggs drew as a cartouche.
In the bottom right hand corner all five members of the band are standing in a line. Dickinson is holding a brain, a reference to Piece of Mind, and drummer Nicko McBrain is wearing aviator goggles (he had a pilot's license by this time, long before Dickinson) and a T-shirt that says "Iron What?". According to Riggs, the band complained because the pictures of themselves were not accurate enough.
To the right of "Long Beach Arena" is a sign which reads "Hammerjacks", a night club and concert hall in Baltimore frequented by the band.
Below Hammerjacks is a sign that reads "Tehe's Bar", which is where the choir vocals in the middle of "Heaven Can Wait" were recorded.
To the left of the clock is a sign that reads "Herbert Ails", a reference to the author Frank Herbert who wrote the book, "Dune," upon which the Iron Maiden song, "To Tame a Land", is based. Herbert had also died that same year, explaining the word "Ails". The reference also refers to the unfriendly response the band received from Herbert (via his agent) regarding permission to use "Dune" as the song's title.
Beneath the Phantom Opera House sign, there is a sign that reads "EMI REC.". All of the band's albums, outside North America, have been released by EMI Records.

Riggs came up with all the in-jokes and references and it took him 3 months to complete the 15x32 inch painting. The process wore him out completely as he underestimated the complexity of the artwork and said he would never paint anything this convoluted ever again.

Track listing

Personnel
Production and performance credits are adapted from the album liner notes.

Iron Maiden
Bruce Dickinson – lead vocals
Dave Murray – guitars, guitar synthesizer
Adrian Smith – guitars, guitar synthesizer, backing vocals, lead vocals on "Reach Out"
Steve Harris – bass, bass synthesizer
Nicko McBrain – drums

Production
Martin "Masa" Birch – producer, engineer, mixing, tape operator
Bruce Buchhalter – second engineer
Sean Burrows – assistant engineer (Compass Point Studios)
Albert Boekholt – assistant engineer (Wisseloord Studios)
Ronald Prent – assistant engineer (Wisseloord Studios)
George Marino – mastering engineer
Derek Riggs – sleeve illustrations
Aaron Rapoport – photography
Rod Smallwood – management, sleeve concept
Andy Taylor – management
Hugh Gilmour – reissue design (1998 edition)

Charts

Weekly charts

Certifications

References

1986 albums
Iron Maiden albums
Albums produced by Martin Birch
EMI Records albums